The term Bocci-bocci is an Italian linguistic corruption of the word Bolshevism, meaning to "Break everything", used particularly in Florence and Tuscany during the Biennio Rosso, in which there was a number of mass strikes against high costs of living, self-management experiments towards autarky through land and factory occupation, and in Turin and Milan, workers councils were formed with factory occupation under the leadership of anarcho-syndicalists.

See also
Biennio Rosso
Sbracciantizzazione
Agricultural policy of Fascist Italy

References
Roberto Bianchi: Bocci-bocci. I tumulti annonari nella Toscana del 1919, Casa Editrice Leo S. Olschki, Florence, 2001 
Roberto Bianchi: Pace, pane, terra. Il 1919 in Italia, Odradek, Rome, 2006 
Fabio Fabbri: Le origini della guerra civile. L'Italia dalla Grande Guerra al fascismo (1918–1921), Utet, Torino, 2009 

History of Tuscany
Anti-fascism in Italy
Kingdom of Italy (1861–1946)